The 540th Aircraft Control and Warning Group is an inactive United States Air Force unit. It was assigned to the 32d Air Division, stationed at Stewart Air Force Base, New York. It was inactivated on 6 February 1952.

This command and control organization activated on 16 February 1953, and was responsible for the organization, manning and equipping of new Aircraft Control and Warning (Radar) units.  It was dissolved after about a year, with the units being assigned directly to the 32d AD.

Components

 653d Aircraft Control and Warning Squadron 
 Stewart AFB, New York, 1 March 1950 – 6 February 1952
 654th Aircraft Control and Warning Squadron
 Brunswick AFS, Maine, 1 January 1951 – 6 February 1952
 655th Aircraft Control and Warning Squadron
 Watertown AFS, New York, 1 June 1950 – 6 February 1952
 656th Aircraft Control and Warning Squadron
 Saratoga Springs AFS, New York, 1 January 1951 – 6 February 1952
 657th Aircraft Control and Warning Squadron
 Fort Williams, Maine, 1 January – 1 October 1951
 690th Aircraft Control and Warning Squadron 
 Kirtland AFB, New Mexico, 1 May 1951 – 6 February 1952 (not manned or equipped)
 762d Aircraft Control and Warning Squadron
 North Truro AFS, Massachusetts, 1 January 1951 – 6 February 1952

 763d Aircraft Control and Warning Squadron
 Lockport AFS, New York, 1 September 1951 – 6 February 1952
 764th Aircraft Control and Warning Squadron
 Saint Albans AFS, Vermont, 1 September 1951 – 6 February 1952
 765th Aircraft Control and Warning Squadron
 Charleston AFS, Maine, 1 January 1951 – 6 February 1952
 766th Aircraft Control and Warning Squadron
 Caswell AFS, Maine, 1–6 February 1952
 767th Aircraft Control and Warning Squadron
 Tierra Amarilla AFS, New Mexico, 1 January – 1 May 1951
 768th Aircraft Control and Warning Squadron
 Moriarty AFS, New Mexico, 1 January – 1 May 1951
 769th Aircraft Control and Warning Squadron
 Continental Divide AFS, New Mexico, 1 January – 1 May 1951

See also
 List of United States Air Force aircraft control and warning squadrons

References

 
 Grant, C.L., The Development of Continental Air Defense to 1 September 1954, (1961), USAF Historical Study No. 126
 
 

Aerospace Defense Command units
Air control groups of the United States Air Force
1951 establishments in New York (state)
1952 disestablishments in New York (state)